Ministry of Legal Affairs serves as the Government of Myanmar's main legal advisory body. The Office is led by the Union Minister Thida Oo who is also serves as Attorney General. After the caretaker government was formed in 2021, the Union Attorney General's Office was reorganized into a ministry on 30 August 2021.

Departments 

 Legislative and Advising Department
 Legal Advice Department
 Prosecution Department
 Administration Department

List of Ministers

Union Ministers

Deputy Ministers 

 San Lwin (30.8.2021 - 12.10.2022)

References

External links

Legal Affairs
Ministries established in 2021
2021 establishments in Myanmar